Casey Weldon may refer to:
Casey Weldon (born 1969), American footballer
Casey Weldon (artist), American artist
Casey Bill Weldon (1901 or 1909–1972), American musician